New Salem is the name of several places:

In Canada:
 New Salem, Nova Scotia

In the United States:
 Lincoln's New Salem, a recreated former frontier village in Menard County, Illinois
 New Salem, Pike County, Illinois
 New Salem Township, McDonough County, Illinois
 New Salem Township, Pike County, Illinois
 New Salem, Rush County, Indiana
 New Salem, Washington County, Indiana
 New Salem, Kansas
 New Salem, Massachusetts
 New Salem, Michigan
 New Salem, New York
 New Salem, North Dakota
 New Salem, Ohio
 New Salem, Pennsylvania, a borough in York County
 New Salem, Armstrong County, Pennsylvania
 New Salem-Buffington, Pennsylvania
 New Salem, Fayette County, Pennsylvania, a census-designated place
 New Salem, Texas

See also
 West Salem (disambiguation)
 Salem (disambiguation)